The Hard-Ons are an Australian punk rock band, which formed in 1982 in Punchbowl, New South Wales. Its founding members were Keish de Silva on lead vocals and drums, Peter "Blackie" Black on guitar and backing vocals, and Ray Ahn on bass guitar. The band issued eight studio albums prior to their disbandment in 1994, and achieved 17 consecutive number-one hits on the Australian alternative charts during their first 12 years as a band. During that time, they became Australia's most commercially successful independent band, with over 250,000 total record sales.. The band reformed in 1997 to release further material, and have remained together ever since. In 2002, de Silva announced his departure from the band. He was replaced on drums by Front End Loader's Peter Kostic, while Black took over on lead vocals. Kostic was later replaced in turn by Conation drummer Murray Ruse in 2011. de Silva returned as a guest vocalist in 2014, and permanently rejoined the band in 2016. This version of the band would stay together for a further five years and one studio album, prior to de Silva's second departure in 2021. You Am I frontman Tim Rogers has since taken over as the band's lead vocalist. 

Australian music historian Ian McFarlane has described the band's music as "fused punk tempos, hardcore attitude, heavy metal riffs and surf-pop melodies into a seamless ball of energy". Although the band has largely had little commercial success, the Hard-Ons have had two singles, two EPs, two studio albums and one greatest hits compilation peak within the ARIA top 100.

Biography

1981–1994: Early days to disbandment
The Hard-Ons' origins are traced to Western Sydney's Punchbowl Boys High School, where three founding members were students. In 1981 the first version of the band, then-known as Dead Rats, included Peter "Blackie" Black on guitar, Brendan Creighton on drums and Shane Keish de Silva on guitar and vocals. In 1982 Creighton left to form Thrust and Raymond Dongwan Ahn joined on bass guitar with de Silva taking over on drums, the group began playing as The Plebs before being renamed as The Hard-Ons by the end of the year. Initially being too young to play in pubs, the band featured at birthday parties and school dances. On 20 June 1984, The Hard-Ons played their first official show at the Vulcan Hotel in Ultimo. Black later recalled "We wanted to be punk rockers ... We didn't want Keish's parents to see so we had bags full of these jackets and chains and stuff and went around the corner of the street and put all these clothes on. Keish's dad busted us". Quickly gaining a considerable following, in August 1985 the band released its debut extended play, Surfin' on My Face, on ViNil Records. This was the beginning of a series of releases for the band that netted them a run of 17 consecutive No. 1 listings on the Australian alternative music charts.

The band demonstrated an independent punk spirit, with the members deliberately controlling their own careers: recording, booking and promoting themselves, creating their own artwork (mostly by Ahn), choosing support bands and even managing the merchandise stand whilst on tour. During 1987 the group were promoted as part of the Australian skate boarding scene. While maintaining a solid if underground following in Australia, The Hard-Ons were popular in Europe, scoring a Top 10 hit in Spain and a Top 5 slot in Greece with their 1989 album, Love is a Battlefield of Wounded Hearts. It also reached the Top 5 on the NME chart; this made The Hard-Ons the third Australian band after Nick Cave and the Bad Seeds and the Go Betweens to do so. In 1989 the group recorded a split EP with British band The Stupids. Two years later they teamed up with Henry Rollins and released a cover version of AC/DC's hit, "Let There Be Rock", which was released in a limited edition on 10" vinyl. In January 1992 the group performed at the inaugural Big Day Out and were joined on-stage by Rollins on four songs. Following the release of 1993's album, Too Far Gone, and after recording a live album for Your Choice Records, the band announced their break up, to pursue projects outside The Hard-Ons' style of music: "after more than ten years of playing the same songs, they were just not interested in doing so any more".

1997–2020: Reformation and beyond
During the break-up of The Hard-Ons, Ahn and Black formed another punk band, Nunchukka Superfly, with Joel Ellis on drums; while de Silva created Malibu Stacey. Nunchukka Superfly released their debut, self-titled album in 1999. Black compared Nunchukka Superfly with The Hard-Ons as "a much heavier and experimental outfit, citing psychedelic, avant-garde, progressive rock, free jazz, funk and dub among the usual inspirations of punk and post-punk". In October 1997 The Hard-Ons played a reunion gig which was followed by the release of a new EP, Yesterday and Today, in 1998 and a compilation album, The Best Of, in 1999. In August 2001, ABC-TV broadcast the rock music series, Long Way to the Top. The Hard-Ons featured on "Episode 6: Gathering of the Tribes 1984–2000" where they were described as "an eclectic band of misfits that took up where punk had left off in the early 80s. Their challenge was to make that sound relevant and exciting in the 1990s. There was nothing left but to get downright offensive".

Following This Terrible Place... in 2000, the band's first line-up change in twenty years occurred, with de Silva deciding to leave the band during 2001. Black took up full-time vocals and Pete Kostic (Front End Loader, Regurgitator) was brought in on drums. In 2002 The Hard-Ons and Boom Boom Kid issued a shared EP, Split!. In 2003 The Hard-Ons released Very Exciting!, their first album for Chatterbox Records. In 2005, the 21st anniversary of the band's first pub gig was celebrated by Australian and European tours as a four-piece, with Kostic drumming and de Silva on vocals. Although technically a three-piece band, de Silva maintained a close relationship with his old band. Recordings were made in 2006 with contributions from all four – though primarily Black, Ahn and Kostic – with the intention of releasing a double album. This project was eventually released as two separate albums: the 'poppier' Most People Are a Waste of Time (2006) and the 'heavier' Most People Are Nicer Than Us (2007), with subsequent tours around Australia. The band recorded with United States comedian Neil Hamburger on guest lead vocals in January 2008. In April 2011, the group announced via their website that Kostic had left. On 5 August that year Murray Ruse (Conation, Captain Cleanoff) played his first show as their new drummer.

In 2012, the band began re-issuing their early catalogue as bonus re-packagings featuring unreleased songs and live tracks. The first to be released was a new 60-track version of Smell My Finger and The Hard-Ons promoted it with a national tour. While working a shift as a taxi driver between legs of that tour on 18 May 2012, Black suffered a severely fractured skull when he was assaulted with a skateboard. Several fund-raising shows were held to raise money for his care and recovery, including special Hard-Ons shows in Sydney and Newcastle on 1 and 2 June that featured the line-up of Ahn, Kostic and de Silva on vocals and guitar. Within three months, Black had recovered sufficiently to perform a short tour in support of his solo album No Dangerous Goods in Tunnel that was followed by a Hard-Ons tour of Europe and Japan. Another Australian tour to wrap up the previously cancelled shows was completed in October, with a 51-track re-release of Dickcheese coming out around the same time.

2021: Tim Rogers
Keish de Silva was removed from the Hard-Ons in March 2021 following allegations of sexual misconduct. A planned documentary on the band was also cancelled.

In August 2021, it was announced that Tim Rogers was the group's new lead singer. The band's thirteenth studio album was released on 8 October 2021, titled I'm Sorry Sir, That Riff's Been Taken. The album debuted at number 4 on the ARIA charts, becoming the band's first to enter the ARIA top 50.

Musical style
Early recordings by The Hard-Ons such as Smell My Finger, Dickcheese, Love Is a Battlefield of Wounded Hearts and Yummy! set the blueprint for the group's sound: messy pop-punk with metal and psychedelia elements. Australian music historian Ian McFarlane described their music as "cheap and potent, their appeal selective. Yet never has so much been owed by so many to so few chords ... fused punk tempos, hardcore attitude, heavy metal riffs and surf-pop melodies into a seamless ball of energy". A 1987 Beat Magazine article described their sound as "Motörhead meets the Beach Boys"; AllMusic's Jody McGregor describes it as a "mix of punk, pop, and metal" with "dashes of power pop, psychedelic rock, thrashy metal, and a healthy dose of humor". Though originally inspired by punk bands such as Sex Pistols, The Buzzcocks, The Damned, Ramones and The Saints, the band also blended pop, psychedelia and metal elements; "death-pop" as described by Ahn. The band were also noteworthy not only within punk but also within rock music for having their lead vocals handled by de Silva, the group's drummer. The physical challenge of drumming to the band's fast punk rock songs as well as singing (as opposed to shouting) made for charismatic live performances. Guitarist Black provided another original touch to the band with his distinctive guitar sound that is both melodic and messy, often making use of feedback.

Major recurring lyrical themes range from girls, love and relationships (as in: "I Do I Do I Do", "Just Being With You", "Girl in the Sweater") to toilet humour ("I Farted", "Oozin' for Pleasure") as well as other variations, particularly in the post-Keish line-up of the band.

Fan reaction
Although not as widely known as some classic punk and independent bands, the Hard-Ons have carved a niche in the world of punk rock and have assembled a cult following of fans worldwide. They are Australia's most successful independent band, with over 250,000 records sold worldwide and 17 consecutive No. 1 hits on the Australian alternative charts. Their popularity far outreaches Australia, with large cult followings in Spain and Greece. At one time there was a Hard-Ons cover band in the UK known as Suck n Swallow.

Band members

Current members
 Ray Ahn – bass guitar, vocals (1982–1993, 1998–present)
 Peter "Blackie" Black – guitar, vocals (1982–1993, 1998–present)
 Murray Ruse – drums (2011–present)
 Tim Rogers – vocals (2021–present)

Former members
 Pete Kostic – drums (2002–2011)
 Keish de Silva – drums (1982–1993, 1998–2001), vocals (1982–1993, 1998–2001, 2016–2021)

Timeline

Discography

Studio albums

Compilation albums

Live albums

Extended plays

Charting singles

DVDs

Reissues

Awards and nominations

AIR Awards
The Australian Independent Record Awards (commonly known informally as AIR Awards) is an annual awards night to recognise, promote and celebrate the success of Australia's Independent Music sector.

! 
|-
| 2022
| I'm Sorry Sir, That Riff's Been Taken
| Best Independent Rock Album or EP
| 
|

References

General
  Note: Archived [on-line] copy has limited functionality.
Specific
 

New South Wales musical groups
Australian punk rock groups
Musical groups established in 1981
Musical groups disestablished in 1994
Musical groups reestablished in 1997
Musical groups from Sydney
Pub rock musical groups
Alternative Tentacles artists
Shield Recordings artists